Since the Prime Minister of India happened to be the ex-officio chairperson of Planning Commission of India, the position of the deputy chairperson had great significance.            
                                 
From 1957 until 2014 23 persons have served as the deputy chairmans,but any woman not served in this post. The deputy chairmans Gulzarilal Nanda, P. V. Narasimha Rao and Manmohan Singh who served as Prime Minister of India. And Pranab Mukherjee who served this post in from 1991 to 1996, after served as the President of India. Many future chief ministers, former central ministers served in this post.

List of Deputy Chairpersons of the Planning Commission

See also 
 NITI Aayog

Notes

References 
 

Economy of India lists
Economic planning in India